Free Play may refer to:

Assorted
 "Free Play", the creative activity of spontaneous free improvisation, by children, by artists, and people of all kinds, as described in the book Free Play: Improvisation in Life and Art, 1990, by Stephen Nachmanovitch – also a 1984 recording of that title by Stephen Nachmanovitch and Ron Fein
 Free play (Derrida), a philosophical concept devised by Jacques Derrida
 Freeplay Energy, a British portable appliance manufacturer and distributor
 Freeplay Replay, a 1990s lottery game played in Iowa
 A play with a defensive penalty (gridiron football), which gives the offense the opportunity to accept either the outcome of the play or the penalty
 A show hosted by Meg Turney, and Ryan Haywood that was produced by Rooster Teeth
 A piece of music that is a radio DJ's personal choice rather than chosen from the station's playlist

Video games
Free-to-play, a video game payment model
 An arcade machine mode where no coins are needed to play
 Freeplay (Festival), the short name for the Freeplay Independent Games Festival from Australia
 A retro arcade chain in the Dallas–Fort Worth metroplex